This is a list of notable podcasts that promote or practice scientific skepticism.

Active

Inactive
These podcasts are either officially on hiatus, have ceased production, or have not produced an episode in over a year.

See also 
 List of books about skepticism
 List of notable skeptics
 List of notable debunkers
 List of skeptical conferences
 List of skeptical magazines
 List of skeptical organizations
 Lists about skepticism

References 

Science podcasts
 
Podcasts
Lists of podcasts